Nomada fucata, the painted nomad bee, is a species of bee in the family Apidae.
The species is distributed over all of Europe and to parts of central Asia. The host of this species is Andrena flavipes.

References

Nomadinae